The National Industrial Training Service of the State of Rio de Janeiro is SENAI´s institution that serves the state. The organization works with vocational education (industry workers' qualification and specialization) and technological innovation in the industry (through technical assistance) of Rio de Janeiro state. It promotes the technology training of industry professionals with focus on professional practice, seeking to supply the demand for employees with higher training and ability to innovate in processes and products.

Areas of vocational education 

The entity operates in several educational fronts, including: courses, technology centers, university and mobile units.

The areas that concern the so-called "creative industries" are covered in the courses of two Rio de Janeiro's units: SENAI Maracanã (audiovisual, computer animation, printing office, design, web and information technology) and SENAI Laranjeiras (audiovisual, computer animation and information technology).

SENAI’s history 

It is possible to say that the idea of creating a school dedicated to the Brazilian industry in appeared in 1865, when "Sain recommended the creation of the first Industrial School in Brazil, which would work at the expense of this Company and that, after being established in 1870, was a precursor of the National Industrial Training Service of the State of Rio de Janeiro (SENAI), which would set in almost a century later."

In 1939 it was assembled a committee to study the feasibility of a qualification system. The study generated a report, subject of debate between the government and businessmen of the time. In 1941, Euvaldo Lodi and Roberto Simonsen managed the then President Getulio Vargas granted companies the responsibility to create an entity of industrial education: "Soon after, in January 1942, Getulio Vargas decreed the creation of SENAI.

It was established that the SENAI, born under the name of National Service of Industrialists' Training, would be maintained through contributions from industry employers. Its scope was broadened to the "transport, communication and fishing sectors, which, conserving the acronym, was renamed the National Industrial Training Service of the State of Rio de Janeiro, by Decree law in 4936, of 7 November 1942".

Notes

References 

Industry in Brazil
Higher education in Brazil
Innovation organizations